Ye is a hentaigana, a variant kana or Japanese syllable, no longer in standard use.

History 
It is presumed that 𛀁 would have represented . Along with 𛀆 (yi) and 𛄟 (wu), the syllable ye has no officially recognized kana; however, during the Meiji period, linguists almost unanimously agreed on the kana for yi, ye, and wu. 𛀆 and 𛄢 are thought to have never occurred as syllables in Japanese, and 𛀁 was merged with え and エ.

Characters

Nara period–Heian period 
Japanese people separated e and ye in Man'yōgana, early Hiragana and early Katakana.

Man'yōgana
e
愛、哀、埃、衣、依、榎、荏、得
可愛
ye
延、曳、睿、叡、盈、要、縁、裔、兄、柄、枝、吉、江

Hiragana
e
(Undiscovered)
ye
 etc.

Katakana
e
𛀀  etc.
ye
エ etc.

After that, e and ye merged into ye in the 10th century, before eventually evolving back to e.

Edo period–Meiji period 
In the Edo period and the Meiji period, some Japanese linguists tried to separate kana e and kana ye again. The shapes of characters differed with each linguist. 𛀁 and 𛄡 were just two of many shapes.

They were phonetic symbols to fill in the blanks of gojuon table. Japanese people didn't separate them in normal writing.

e
Traditional kana
え (Hiragana)
 (Hentaigana  of え. Hiragana.)
エ (Katakana)
Constructed kana
 (A part of 衣. Katakana.)
 (A part of 衣. Katakana.)
 (A part of 衣. Katakana.)
 (A part of 衣. Katakana.)
 (A part of 衣. Katakana.)

ye
Traditional kana
え (平仮名)
𛀁 (Hentaigana  of え. Hiragana.)
 (Hentaigana  of え. Hiragana.)
 (Hentaigana  of え. Hiragana.)
 (Hentaigana  of え. Hiragana.)
エ (Katakana)
Constructed kana
え〻 (え with dots. Hiragana.)
エ〻 (エ with dots. Katakana.)
 (A part of 衣. Katakana.)
 (A part of 衣. Katakana.)
 (A part of 衣. Katakana.)
𛄡 (A part of 延. Katakana.)
 (A part of 兄. Katakana.)
 (A part of 延. Katakana.)

These suggestions weren't accepted.

Unicode 
The hiragana version is encoded as HIRAGANA LETTER ARCHAIC YE (with the normative alias of HENTAIGANA LETTER E-1) in the position U+1B001. The katakana version is encoded as KATAKANA LETTER ARCHAIC YE, in the position of U+1B121.

References

See also 

 Yi (kana)
 Wu (kana)

Specific kana